The Gove Dam is an embankment dam on the Kunene River about  south of Huambo in Huambo Province, Angola. The purpose of the dam is to control floods and generate hydroelectric power. It has a power generating capacity of  each) (three turbines of  each), enough to power over 30,000 homes.

History
The Gove Dam cost US$279 million and was built by Brazilian construction group Odebrecht.  It was formally inaugurated in August 2012 by the Angolan President.  The dam produces power for the cities of Caála, Huambo, and Kuito.

Construction of the dam began in 1969 and it was completed in 1975. Construction of the power station was halted twice, from 1975 to 1983 due to the civil war, then again from 1986 to 2001 also due to fighting. The dam was partially destroyed by dynamite in 1990. Along with the power station, sub-stations at Caála, Dango, and Benfica (in Huambo) were inaugurated at the time of completion. The sub-stations and distribution network cost US$80 million.

See also

Ruacana Power Station – downstream in Namibia, built in conjunction with the Gove Dam

References

Dams completed in 1975
Energy infrastructure completed in 2012
Gove
Hydroelectric power stations in Angola
Huambo Province
2012 establishments in Angola
Embankment dams
1975 establishments in Angola